Chernozemelsky District is an administrative and municipal district (raion), one of the thirteen in the Republic of Kalmykia, Russia. It is located in the southeast of the republic. Its administrative center is the rural locality (a settlement) of Komsomolsky. As of the 2010 Census, the total population of the district was 13,258, with the population of Komsomolsky accounting for 34.1% of that number. It is the least densely populated district in the Southern Federal District.

History
The district was established in 1951.

Administrative and municipal status
Within the framework of administrative divisions, Chernozemelsky District is one of the thirteen in the Republic of Kalmykia. The district is divided into eight rural administrations which comprise thirty-five rural localities. As a municipal division, the district is incorporated as Chernozemelsky Municipal District. Its eight rural administrations are incorporated as eight rural settlements within the municipal district. The settlement of Komsomolsky serves as the administrative center of both the administrative and municipal district.

References

Notes

Sources

Districts of Kalmykia
 
States and territories established in 1951